Sportsound is BBC Radio Scotland's main radio sports show. It provides coverage to listeners on medium wave, FM, DAB Digital Radio and via the internet. It is best known for its exclusive live commentary of Scottish Premiership football games. It is broadcast seven days a week, and on on-match days has an 1810–2200 slot on 810 MW. On Saturdays, at least two matches are broadcast by MW, and the main FM frequency with the Open All Mics feature broadcast on the BBC Radio nan Gàidheal frequency and the remaining matches online where the other matches are simulcast.

Presenters 
Richard Gordon (host of most live matches and Saturday's Open All Mics programme)
Kenny Macintyre (host of Monday night show)
Geoff Webster (host of live rugby and Sunday show)
David Currie (midweek host)

Commentators and pitchside 
Rob MacLean (main commentator)
Paul Mitchell
Liam McLeod
John Barnes
Alisdair Lamont
Chick Young
Scott Davie
Chris McLaughlin
Jane Lewis
Charlie Mann
Charles Bannerman
Brian McLauchlin
Martin Dowden
Sandra Brown
David McDaid

Analysts 
Michael Stewart
Willie Miller
Derek Ferguson
Murdo MacLeod
Craig Paterson
Allan Preston
Kenny Miller
Steven Thompson
James McFadden
John Robertson
Tom English 
Michael Grant (Herald Scotland)
Graham Spiers (Herald Scotland)
Richard Wilson

Additionally, former managers, assistant managers and players can be heard as guest analysts.

Former presenters 
Brian Marjoribanks (original host)
Tom Ferrie
Derek Rae
Roy Small
Roddy Forsyth

Former commentators and analysts 
David Begg
Alastair Alexander
Jock Brown
David Francey
Roddy Forsyth
Donald Garden
Jim Traynor
Derek Rae
Gordon Smith
Billy Dodds

Player of the Year Award 
At the end of the Scottish football season, the player in the Scottish Premier League who has accumulated the most man-of-the match awards from the league season is awarded the Sportsound Player of the Year.

References

External links
BBC Radio Scotland Sportsound

Football mass media in Scotland
BBC Radio Scotland programmes
British sports radio programmes